4 x 4 is an album by American composer, bandleader and keyboardist Carla Bley with a chamber ensemble recorded in Oslo in 1999 and released on the Watt/ECM label in 2000.

Reception
The Allmusic review by David R. Adler awarded the album 3 stars and stated "This batch of compositions is informed by Bley's distinctive brand of tongue-in-cheek playfulness... While the entire eight-piece band is consistently a pleasure, some of the album's most appealing moments occur during several Bley/Swallow duet passages. The two have been performing and recording as a duo for many years, so in a certain sense the whole band seems to revolve around them".  The JazzTimes review by Aaron Steinberg said "Between gigs, the ruddy and no doubt road weary outfit took a time-out in Oslo to record 4 x 4. Bley and the band sound happy to have the time to themselves, and they mostly take it easy on light-hearted tunes with fun but simple arrangements". The Penguin Guide to Jazz awarded it  stars stating "with music as impressive and as ambitious as this, who's complaining? "

Track listing

Recorded at Rainbow Studio, Oslo in July 1999.

Personnel
Carla Bley – piano
Lew Soloff – trumpet  
Wolfgang Puschnig – alto saxophone  
Andy Sheppard – tenor saxophone  
Gary Valente – trombone  
Larry Goldings – organ  
Steve Swallow – bass guitar  
Victor Lewis – drums

References

ECM Records albums
Carla Bley albums
2000 albums